Outlaws' Paradise is a 1939 American Western film directed by Sam Newfield and was produced by Victory Pictures Corporations

Plot 
Gang leader Trigger Mallory is about to be released from prison. When Bill Carson notices the resemblance, he gets the Warden to hold Mallory and he assumes his identity. He fools both the gang and Trigger's girlfriend Jessie as he sets them up to be captured. But Trigger escapes from prison and returns to expose the hoax and Bill is made a prisoner.

Cast 
Tim McCoy as Captain William "Lightning Bill" Carson / Trigger Mallory
Joan Barclay as Jessie Treadwell
Ben Corbett as Magpie Magillicuddy
Ted Adams as Slim Marsh
Forrest Taylor as Henchman Eddie
Bob Terry as Henchman Steve
Donald Gallaher as Henchman Mort
Dave O'Brien as Henchman Meggs
Jack Mulhall as Prison Warden

Trivia 

 This film's earliest documented telecasts took place in Philadelphia Thursday 11 August 1949 on Frontier Playhouse on WPTZ (Channel 3), in Cincinnati Saturday 16 October 1949 on WLW-T (Channel 4), and in Los Angeles Saturday 28 October 1949 on KFI (Channel 9).

Reception 
Martin Hafer suggests "Despite McCoy's fun performance, clichés and poor writing keep this one from being among his best."

Follow-up film 
Six Gun Theater: Outlaw's Paradise was released on June 3, 2015, based on the original Outlaw's Paradise

References

External links 

Review of film at Variety

1939 films
1930s English-language films
American black-and-white films
1939 Western (genre) films
American Western (genre) films
Films directed by Sam Newfield
Revisionist Western (genre) films
1930s American films